Baby Ballroom: The Championship was a dancing show on ITV, which began on Saturday 28 July 2007.

Twelve pairs of juvenile ballroom dancers, aged between six and eleven, competed for the title of Baby Ballroom Champion. The dancers had to impress a panel of three celebrity judges: X Factor's runner up dancer  and actor Ray Quinn, former child star actress singer  and dancer  Bonnie Langford and famous dance tutor and dancer Pierre Dulaine. 

Kate Thornton presented the show, where the public decided who went into the final, which was held on Saturday, 11 August. The winners of Baby Ballroom: The Championship were Kim and Josh.

2000s British reality television series
2007 British television series debuts
ITV (TV network) original programming